Harold Fowler may refer to:

Harold Fowler (sailor) (1899–1975), Olympic sailor
Hal Fowler (1927–2000), American poker player
Harold G. Fowler, landscape architect
Harold Fowler (RAF officer) (1886–1957), British soldier
Harold North Fowler, American classicist

See also
Harold Fowler McCormick (1872–1941), American businessman
Harry Fowler (disambiguation)